Hırmanlı is a village in Silifke district of Mersin Province, Turkey. The population of Hırmanlı   is 268 as of 2011.

References

Villages in Silifke District